There are three Rivers in Romania that have part of their name Criş:

 Crişul Alb
 Crişul Negru
 Crişul Repede

The first two form the River Criş in Hungary.

Other 
 Ținutul Crișuri

See also 
 Criș (disambiguation)
 Crișana (disambiguation)